Apuanite (IMA symbol: Apu) is a rare iron antimony mineral with the chemical formula FeFeSbOS. Its type locality is the Province of Lucca, Italy.

References

External links 

 Apuanite data sheet
 Apuanite on the Handbook of Mineralogy

Iron(II,III) minerals
Antimony minerals
Oxygen compounds
Sulfur(−II) compounds